Just Married is a 2003 American romantic comedy film.

Just Married may also refer to:

 Just Married (1928 film), a 1928 American comedy silent film
 Just Married (2007 film), a 2007 Bollywood film
 "Just Married" (song), a 1958 single by Marty Robbins